Skenella is a genus of minute sea snails, marine gastropod mollusks in the family Cingulopsidae.

Species
Species within the genus Skenella include:
 Skenella castanea (Laseron, 1950)
 Skenella conica (Kay, 1979)
 Skenella edwardiensis (Watson, 1886)
 Skenella georgiana Pfeffer, 1886
 Skenella hallae Ponder & Worsfold, 1994
 Skenella paludinoides (Smith, 1902)
 Skenella pfefferi Suter, 1909
 Skenella ponderi (Kay, 1979)
 Skenella porcellana (Ponder & Yoo, 1980)
 Skenella sinapi (Watson, 1886)
 Skenella spadix (Ponder, 1965)
 Skenella translucida (Ponder & Yoo, 1980)
 Skenella umbilicata Ponder, 1983
 Skenella wareni Ponder & Worsfold, 1994
 Skenella westralis (Ponder & Yoo, 1980)
 Species brought into synonymy
 Skenella minima Thiele, 1925: synonym of Eatoniella minima (Thiele, 1925)

References

 A review of the genera of the Cingulopsidae with a revision of the Australian and tropical Indo-Pacific species (Mollusca: Gastropoda: Prosobranchia). Records of the Australian Museum, 33(1) 1980: 1-88
 Ponder, W. F. (1983) Rissoaform gastropods from the Antarctic and sub-Antarctic: the Eatoniellidae, Rissoidae, Barleeidae, Cingulopsidae, Orbitestellidae and Rissoellidae (Mollusca: Gastropoda) of Signy Island, South Orkney Islands, with a review of the Antarctic and sub-Antarctic (excluding southern South America and the New Zealand sub-Antarctic islands) species. British Antarctic Survey, Scientific Reports 108: 1-96

Cingulopsidae